Petr Alabin, (1824–1896) was a Russian count, civil servant, public figure and journalist. He began the production of the Samara flag for the Bulgarian Volunteer Corps. During the Provisional Russian Administration in Bulgaria (1878-1879), he was governor of Sofia.

Early life 
Alabin came from a noble family. His father married a Frenchwoman. He graduated from the St. Petersburg Trade School. He enlisted in the Russian Imperial Army as an officer and participated in the suppression of the Hungarian Revolution. He took part in the Crimean War and the defense of Sevastopol.

Alabin was a prominent figure in the Slavic Charity Organization. He was the first chairman of the Samara National Audit Office, serving for 10 years, after which he became governor of Samara.

After his return from free Bulgaria, he was mayor of Samara and an MP in the Duma.

See also
 Petr Alabin in Russian
 Alexander Nevsky Cathedral, Sofia

References

1824 births
1896 deaths
People from Podolsk
Russian military personnel of the Russo-Turkish War (1877–1878)
Politicians from Samara, Russia
Mayors of Sofia